In Nazi Germany, lesbians who were sent to concentration camps were often categorized as "asocial", if they had not been otherwise targeted based on their ethnicity or political stances. Female homosexuality was criminalized in Austria, but not other parts of Nazi Germany. Because of the relative lack of interest of the Nazi state in female homosexuality compared to male homosexuality, there are fewer sources to document the situations of lesbians in Nazi Germany.

Background 
In Berlin, lesbian bars and night clubs opened up in the aftermath of the First World War. Notable amongst them was the Mali und Igel, run by entrepreneur Elsa Conrad. Inside the bar was a club called Monbijou des Westens. The club was exclusive and catered for Berlin's lesbian intellectual elite; one famous guest was the actress Marlene Dietrich. Each year the club hosted balls with up to 600 women in attendance. A campaign to close all homosexual bars, including lesbian ones, began in March 1933. All lesbian periodicals (such as Die Freundin) and organizations were also targeted for closure.

Historiography 
Historians investigating individual cases have come to varying conclusions. Women in Nazi Germany accused of a lesbian relationship faced a different fate depending on their characteristics. Those who were Jewish, black, or politically opposed to the regime faced imprisonment in a concentration camp or death—sentences that in some cases were likely made more harsh by the victims' lesbian identity. In contrast, historian Samuel Clowes Huneke concludes that lesbians accused of non-political crimes were not treated differently based on being lesbian, and simply being denounced as lesbian typically led to a police investigation but no punishment. Therefore, he suggests "heterogenous persecution" as one way that lesbian experiences in Nazi Germany might be described.

Historian Laurie Marhoefer argues that "Though not the subjects of an official state persecution, gender-nonconforming women, transvestites, and women who drew negative attention because of their lesbianism ran a clear, pronounced risk of provoking anxiety in neighbours, acquaintances, and state officials, and that anxiety could, ultimately, inspire the kind of state violence that [Ilse] Totzke suffered"—imprisonment in Ravensbrück concentration camp.

Memorials
In 2008, there was a controversy over the Memorial to Homosexuals Persecuted Under Nazism in Tiergarten, Berlin about the initial non-inclusion of lesbians in the memorial. Critics argued that, while lesbians did not face systematic persecution to the same extent as gay men, it was appropriate to memorialize those women who had been sent to concentration camps. A plan to replace the initial video with one that included women faced a backlash from opposing historians, activists, and memorial directors who argued that it would be "falsification" to include lesbians. Despite efforts by some lesbian activists to commemorate lesbians imprisoned and murdered at Ravensbrück,  there has not been agreement on the establishment of a lesbian memorial at the camp. Huneke argues that even though lesbians were not systematically persecuted, it may be appropriate to erect memorials because some lesbians in Nazi Germany faced violence and discrimination.

See also 

 Persecution of homosexuals in Nazi Germany

 Margot Heuman
 Henny Schermann
 Ovida Delect
 Elsa Conrad
 Mary Pünjer
 Margarete Rosenberg (Holocaust survivor)
 Elli Smula

References

Sources

Further reading

External links

1930s in LGBT history
1940s in LGBT history
History of women in Germany
Lesbian history
LGBT in Nazi Germany
Women in Nazi Germany